Bart Bramley (born 1948) is an American bridge player. Bramley is from Chicago, Illinois. Bramley has lived in Dallas, Texas since 2003. Bramley's wife Judy Bramley was also a Bridge player.

Bridge accomplishments

Awards

 ACBL Player of the Year (1) 1997
 Herman Trophy (1) 1997
 Mott-Smith Trophy (1) 1997

Wins

 North American Bridge Championships (15)
 von Zedtwitz Life Master Pairs (1) 2006 
 Silodor Open Pairs (1) 1984 
 Blue Ribbon Pairs (2) 2002, 2009 
 Nail Life Master Open Pairs (2) 1987, 1995 
 Jacoby Open Swiss Teams (3) 1984, 1990, 1997 
 Roth Open Swiss Teams (1) 2013 
 Vanderbilt (1) 1989 
 Senior Knockout Teams (1) 2013 
 Keohane North American Swiss Teams (1) 2008 
 Mitchell Board-a-Match Teams (1) 1980 
 Reisinger (1) 1997

Runners-up

 North American Bridge Championships (13)
 Rockwell Mixed Pairs (1) 1981 
 Wernher Open Pairs (1) 1997 
 Grand National Teams (2) 1988, 2004 
 Jacoby Open Swiss Teams (2) 1991, 1994 
 Vanderbilt (1) 1986 
 Senior Knockout Teams (1) 2012 
 Mitchell Board-a-Match Teams (2) 1976, 1987 
 Reisinger (1) 2012 
 Spingold (2) 1981, 1988

Notes

External links
 

Living people
American contract bridge players
1948 births
Date of birth missing (living people)
Place of birth missing (living people)
People from Chicago